GLL-8 (GLL-VK), nicknamed "Igla" (eng. needle), is a Russian hypersonic flight flying laboratory. It saw its first flight in 2005. It is part of Russia's ongoing ORYOL-2-1 research programme. Under ORYOL-2-1, the Gromov Flight Research Institute in Moscow has developed two possible Igla designs, and is leading an SSTO spaceplane effort and a two-stage-to-orbit design conceived to build a "Mir-2" space station.

Purpose
The purpose of this "flying laboratory" is technical data study of hypersonic speeds, which cannot be done with average engines, and other crewed experimental flight-craft. This study includes the following:

 Aerodynamic properties at hyper sonic speeds
 Maneuverability at different speeds
 G-force effects on fuselage at high speeds
 Scramjet studies

Vehicles associated with the GLL-8

References

Russian Spaceweb "Igla" (Russian)
"Testpilot" page (Russian)

Hypersonic aircraft
Aircraft manufactured in Russia
Experimental aircraft
Unmanned aerial vehicles of Russia